Jirsar may refer to:
 Jirsar-e Bahambar
 Jirsar-e Baqer Khaleh
 Jirsar-e Chukam
 Jirsar-e Efnak
 Jirsar-e Nowdeh
 Jirsar-e Vishka